Anolis armouri, the black-throated stout anole or armoured anole, is a species of lizard in the family Dactyloidae. The species is found in Hispaniola.

References

Anoles
Reptiles of Haiti
Reptiles of the Dominican Republic
Reptiles described in 1934
Taxa named by Doris Mable Cochran